Raj Bhavan (translation: Government House) is the official winter residence of the  Lieutenant Governor of Jammu and Kashmir. It is located in the Winter capital city Jammu, Jammu and Kashmir.

Raj Bhavan of Jammu was one of the Maharaja's palace buildings, Ranbir Mahal, which is under the tenancy of the State Government of Jammu and Kashmir.

The Raj Bhavan overlooks the river Tawi. It is spread over an area of 6.17 hectares (126 kanals) and 7 marlas and has a spacious and beautiful lawn in front where all the ceremonial functions are held.

The President of India, the Prime Minister of India and other dignitaries stay in the Raj Bhavan when on visit to Jammu.

See also
 List of official residences of India
 Government Houses of the British Indian Empire

References

External links
The official website of Governor of Jammu and Kashmir

Governors' houses in India
Government of Jammu and Kashmir
Buildings and structures in Jammu (city)